The Ernest J. Gaines Award for Literary Excellence is an annual national literary award designed to recognize rising African-American fiction writers. First awarded in 2007, the prize is underwritten by donors of the Baton Rouge Area Foundation in honor of the literary heritage provided by author Ernest J. Gaines, with the winner receiving a cash award ($15,000 as of 2020) "to support and enable the writer to focus on writing." It has been described as "the nation's biggest prize for African-American writers".

Past winners

Panel of judges
 Anthony Grooms
 Edward P. Jones
 Elizabeth Nunez
 Francine Prose
 Patricia Towers

References

External links 
 

African-American literature
American literary awards
Literary awards honoring minority groups
Scholarships in the United States
Awards established in 2007